Keelkattalai (also written as Kilkattalai or Keezhkattalai) is a suburb in the south of Chennai, Tamil Nadu under the Tambaram Municipal Corporation.

Statistics 
 Census of India, Keelkattalai had a population of 27,981.

History

The name Keelkattalai is derived from the word கீழ் from கிழக்கு (east) and கட்டளை (village) and translates to "The village to the east", with respect to Pallavaram, a Pallava era settlement.
Initially, Keelkattalai was incorporated as a village panchayat and on 17 January 1970, it was merged with the Zamin Pallavaram Town Panchayat, Issa Pallavaram Town Panchayat, Hasthinapuram Town Panchayat and Nemilichery Panchayat to form the Pallavaram municipality

Connectivity 
Keelkattalai enjoys a well connected road network to major hubs in the city through two arterial roads connecting namely the Medavakkam Main Road and Pallavaram-Thoraipakkam Radial Road (SH 109). The area is served well by buses serviced by the Metropolitan Transport Corporation (Chennai) to major locations inside the city. Despite having no railway connectivity, Keelkattalai is easily accessible from Pallavaram (Chennai Suburban Railway), St Thomas Mount (Chennai Suburban Railway) and Velachery (MRTS, Chennai Mass Rapid Transit System)

Bus Routes

This list includes buses originating from Keelkattalai and the ones passing through Keelkattalai bus terminus.

Food, Shopping and Recreation

Food
Domino's Pizza, Aarya bhavan, Muniyandi vilas, Busty Burgers, Subway, Alreef, Raintree, Adyar Ananda Bhavan, Sri Krishna Sweets,South Services,

Shopping
Reliance Digital, Sathya's,  Poorvika Mobiles, The MobileStore, Reliance Trends, Girias, Mega mart, Reliance trends, Pandian stores, Majestic, Mokka kadai, Mother's World, Bata, Nilgiris 1905

Attractions
Keelkattalai Lake is the main attraction.

Social Infrastructure

Schools
 Apple Kids International Pre-School
 Holy Family Convent Matriculation Higher Secondary School
 Sri Sankara Vidyalaya Matriculation School
 Kiddies Choice Montessori & Kindergarten School
 Vael's vidyashram Global School
 Vel's Higher Secondary School
 Velankanni Matriculation Higher Secondary School
 Baalyaa Senior Secondary School
 Pallavaram Municipality Middle School

Hospitals

Grace Multispeciality Hospital
Vijayam Hospital
Divya Hospital

Government

Lok Sabha Representative
Sriperumbudur (Lok Sabha constituency)

Pallavaram State Assembly Representative
Pallavaram (State Assembly Constituency)

Pallavaram Municipality Counsilors

Upcoming/Proposed infrastructure work 

 Three lane, Unidirectional flyover at the Medavakkam Main Road and Radial road intersection
 Chennai Metro Rail station at Keelkattalai (Phase 2)
 Water supply improvement scheme in Pallavaram municipality
 Underground sewerage network in the municipal limits
 Widening of the Medavakkam main road.

Location in context

References

External links 
 Things to do in Kilkattalai Search | Facebook Help Center
 A village in the city ‘A village in the city’

Neighbourhoods in Chennai
Suburbs of Chennai